The Sacramental Element is a compilation by the post-hardcore band Saccharine Trust, released in 1986 through SST. It is a cassette-only release compiling the band's first two releases, Paganicons and Surviving You, Always, accompanied by three other tracks ("Hearts & Barbarians", "Disillusioned Fool" and "A Christmas Cry") from that era.

Track listing

References 

1986 compilation albums
SST Records compilation albums
Saccharine Trust albums